Åkerberg is a Swedish surname. Notable people with the surname include:

Peter Åkerberg (born 1960), Swedish fencer
Thomas Åkerberg (born 1959), Swedish fencer
Ulrika Åkerberg (born 1941), Swedish curler

Swedish-language surnames